Antonio Diaz Soto y Gama (23 January 1880 – 14 March 1967) was a Mexican politician and revolutionary during the Mexican Revolution.

Biography
He was born in San Luis Potosí to Conrado Díaz Soto y Gama and Concepción Cruz. He studied in San Luis Potosí, first at the Instituto de la Immaculada Concepción and later at the Instituto Literario.

During the early 1900s he was associated with Ricardo Flores Magón's anarchist group Mexican Liberal Party (Partido Liberal Mexicano-), which was involved in strikes and uprisings in Mexico from 1906 to 1911. He was also active with the Magon brothers' newspaper El Hijo del Ahuizote. In August 1911, together with Magón he helped co-found the successor party, "Liberal Party" (Partido Liberal). He was also the secretary and vice president of the Liberal Club "Ponciano Arriaga" (named after the 19th century lawyer) and was imprisoned by the regime of Porfirio Díaz for his activities, and later forced into exile in United States. While there he published a liberal newspaper in El Paso, Social Reform with an editorial agenda which opposed the Diaz dictatorship.

During the presidency of Francisco I. Madero, Díaz Soto y Gama helped found the Casa del Obrero Mundial (House of the World Worker) in Mexico City. After Victoriano Huerta ousted Madero in February 1913, Díaz Soto y Gama joined the movement of Emiliano Zapata.

He played a prominent role at the Convention of Aguascalientes in 1914, following the victory of Huerta. During the convention Soto y Gama's speech and disrespect for the Mexican flag, which he said symbolized the "triumph of clerical reaction", caused a protest from some of the participants, many of whom threatened him by pointing their guns at him. However, his presence at the convention contributed greatly to the adoption of the Zapatista Plan of Ayala. Since Zapata's backing came mostly from rural campesinos, Soto y Gama also served as his representative to urban workers, including the anarcho-syndicalist union Casa del Obrero Mundial.

In 1917 he came into conflict with another Zapatista chief, Otilio Montaño Sánchez and played a role in having Otilio executed. After Zapata's murder in 1919, Soto y Gama continued to advise Zapata's successor, Gildardo Magaña and eventually joined the movement of Alvaro Obregon (whom Antonio called "the executor of the ideas of Emiliano Zapata") in opposition to Venustiano Carranza. Although President Obregón had asked him to serve in his cabinet as Minister of Agriculture, Díaz Soto y Gama declined.

After the revolution he was a member of the Mexican Chamber of Deputies in the Mexican Congress. He was the leader of the National Agrarian Party (Partido Nacional Agrarista, PNA), which he founded on 13 June 1920. The platform of the party called for redistribution of land to peasants. As a representative of the party he served four terms in the Mexican congress between 1920 and 1928. During the presidency of Lázaro Cárdenas he served in the Ministry of Agriculture.

In the late 1930s Antonio received a chair in History and Agricultural Law at the University of Mexico and also worked as a newspaper columnist.

He died in Mexico City in March 1967, one of the few major figures of the Mexican Revolution to have died a natural death.

References

Mexican revolutionaries
1880 births
1967 deaths
Zapatistas
Magonists